SAPO was the old name for what is now Transnet Port Terminals, which operates 13 terminals in 6 South African ports.  It is the port management division of Transnet, the South African transport giant.

Operations
List of ports:
Cape Town
Durban - "the largest port in Africa" according to the company's website 
East London
Port Elizabeth
Richards Bay 
Saldanha Bay - handles South Africa's iron ore exports.

The new port of Ngqura, at Coega, 20 km northeast of Port Elizabeth, scheduled to open in 2006, is funded by Transnet and operated by SAPO.

SAPO operates in four sectors: automotive, container, break-bulk and bulk.  A detailed description of the company's operational organization is written at its website's "SA Terminals" section.

The company has budgeted R1.5 bn for improvements in its 2007 fiscal year, according to the operational report at Transnet.

As of 2009 the company has rebranded as Transnet Port Terminals with new logo.

External links
 SAPO's Operational Report at the Transnet site
 South Africa's Ports and Ships website; report on the new port of Ngqura
 Transnet National Ports Authority

Transport operators of South Africa
Transnet
Port operating companies